Nasarawa Amazons F.C. is a women's association football club based in Lafia in Nasarawa State, the club is related to the men's football club Nasarawa United. The home jersey is green, the away jersey is white with a diagonal sky blue stripe.

History 
The club was founded by the government of Nasarawa State in year 2000. The nickname of the club, Solid Babes is gotten from the official slogan of the state.

They won the Nigeria Women Premier League in 2013 and 2017, and were runners-up in 2006, 2007 and 2016. They've also won the Nigerian Women's Cup  twice, with their recent win in 2019

In 2010, Nasarawa Amazons were evicted from their home camping ground in Lafia for failure to pay accumulated rents. In 2012, Amazons played Pelican Stars F.C. to qualify for the super six tournament that determines the overall winner of the league. In 2013, the governor of Nasarawa State, Umaru Tanko Al-Makura donated ₦ 40,000,000 to aid the running of the club and in recognition of the outstanding performance of the team.  Amazons were suspended during the 2016 season but were reinstated back to the league after an appeal.

Current squad 
<small>Squad list for 2022 season.

Management 
 Head Coach: Christopher Danjuma

Notable players 
 Anam Imo
 Mariam Ibrahim
 Chinaza Uchendu
 Amarachi Okoronkwo
 Sarah Nnodim
 Christy Ucheibe

Honours
Nigeria Women Premier League:Winners (2): 2013, 2017
Nigerian Women's Cup:Winners(2): 2005, 2019

References

Women's football clubs in Nigeria
Nigeria Women Premier League clubs
Lafia
Association football clubs established in 2000
2000 establishments in Nigeria
NWFL Premiership clubs